Sirimewan Keerthi Ranasinghe (born 4 July 1962) is a Sri Lankan cricketer who played four One Day Internationals in 1986.

He was a professional Middlesex CCC coach who trains youth at the Finchley Academy. He studied at Nalanda College Colombo and captained college first XI cricket team in 1982.

Ranasinghe now works as head coach at Westminster School. He is an inspirational figure to all, especially with his five-minute batting and bowling drills, and prides his coaching skills on pushing his players to the limit.

External links

"Mahela dazzles with flawless century"

1962 births
Living people
Sri Lankan cricketers
Sri Lanka One Day International cricketers
Alumni of Nalanda College, Colombo
Middlesex Cricket Board cricketers